Cassidy Cox (born June 18, 1998) is an American archer competing in women's compound events. She won the silver medal in the women's team compound event at the 2019 World Archery Championships held in 's-Hertogenbosch, Netherlands.

In 2017, Cox and Kris Schaff won the bronze medal in the mixed team compound event at the World Games held in Wrocław, Poland.

In 2020, she finished in 10th place in the women's compound event at The Vegas Shoot held in Las Vegas, United States.

References

External links 
 

Living people
1998 births
Place of birth missing (living people)
American female archers
World Archery Championships medalists
Competitors at the 2017 World Games
World Games bronze medalists
World Games medalists in archery
20th-century American women
21st-century American women